Frederick George Crouch (1 February 1843 – 1 January 1922) was an English-born Australian politician.

He was born in London to merchant William Crouch and Caroline Hart. He arrived in New South Wales in 1854 and opened a store on Richmond Road in Sydney. He also had interests in northern New South Wales, serving as alderman and mayor of Casino. On 7 January 1869 he married Ada Rebecca Gregory, with whom he had eleven children. Crouch was elected to the New South Wales Legislative Assembly in 1887 as a Protectionist member for Richmond, but he did not run for re-election in 1889. In 1894 he moved to Randwick, where he died in 1922.

References

 

1843 births
1922 deaths
Members of the New South Wales Legislative Assembly
Protectionist Party politicians
English emigrants to colonial Australia